Sam Darwish is a U.S. entrepreneur active in the telecommunications industry. He is Chairman and CEO of IHS Towers, which operates more than 39,000 towers across three continents and listed on the NYSE in October 2021.

Early life and education

Darwish was brought up and educated in Beirut during the Lebanese Civil War.

Business career

He began his professional career in 1992, in Beirut, after joining MCI as an executive. At the time, the company was one of the world's largest telecoms carriers. He then joined Libancell, now known as MTC Touch, where he assumed a leading role in establishing the first Lebanese mobile network. Subsequently, in 1998, he was appointed Deputy Managing Director of Motophone, Nigeria's first GSM operator.

Following the Nigerian government's 2001 plan to privatize its telecommunications industry, he set up a mobile infrastructure company, IHS Towers, which he has led since then. Under his tenure as CEO, the company has been named one of the largest equity fundraisers in Africa, as well as one of the overall largest fundraisers of the past decade. 

During his tenure, IHS Towers became a publicly listed company on the New York Stock Exchange in October 2021, and noted as the largest IPO of a firm of African heritage to list on the Exchange.

In 2015, he was nominated Business Leader of the Year for West Africa as part of the All Africa Business Leaders Awards in collaboration with CNBC Africa. In 2016, he won the award for his founding and continued leadership of IHS Towers.

Other ventures
Darwish has founded additional businesses in the US and Middle East such as Vorex, a software provider for small enterprises across the US. He is also the Founder and President of Singularity Investments, Dar Properties and Dar Telecom.

Darwish has been involved in setting up incubator programs for aspiring tech entrepreneurs in Lagos and oversees local community projects throughout the emerging markets. He has been a financier behind the establishment of educational facilities in underserved areas throughout Africa.

In September 2015, he served on an entrepreneur judging panel for She Leads Africa, a venture which invests in promising women entrepreneurs from across the continent. 

Darwish is also on the advisory board of the Woodrow Wilson Center, a bipartisan think tank based in Washington DC, and also a Trustee of the Intrepid Sea, Air & Space Museum.

References

American businesspeople
American people of Lebanese descent
Year of birth missing (living people)
Living people
Naturalized citizens of Nigeria
Nigerian people of Lebanese descent
Nigerian businesspeople
Nigerian financiers
Businesspeople from Beirut
American University of Beirut alumni